HMS Royal Sovereign was a 100-gun first rate ship of the line of the Royal Navy, built at Woolwich Dockyard and launched in July 1701. She had been built using some of the salvageable timbers from the previous , which had been destroyed by fire in 1697.

Service

She was Admiral George Rooke's flagship in the War of the Spanish Succession. She was later the flagship of Admiral Clowdisley Shovell. In the Seven Years' War she was flagship of the Portsmouth fleet. Admiral Boscawen received the death warrant for Admiral John Byng in the captain's cabin in March 1757, and here authorised the firing squad on the nearby HMS Monarch.

Royal Sovereign formed the basis for the dimensions for 100-gun ships in the 1719 Establishment, being a generally well-regarded vessel. In practice, only Royal Sovereign herself was affected by this Establishment, being the only first rate ship either built or rebuilt to the Establishment in its original form, but the Royal William and Britannia had been rebuilt to the same dimensions (approximately) when both were re-launched in 1719. She underwent her rebuild to the 1719 Establishment at Chatham after an order of 18 February 1724, being relaunched on 28 September 1728.

The rebuilt Royal Sovereign remained in service until she was broken up in 1768, ending her career with a total of 67 years' service in the Royal Navy.

In popular culture
In the 2013 video game Assassin's Creed IV: Black Flag, HMS Royal Sovereign, partnered with HMS Fearless, appears as one of the legendary ships which the protagonist Edward Kenway could encounter and sink in the Caribbean sea. As the two ships sail and fight together, either Royal Sovereign and Fearless are both sunk in battle with the Jackdaw, or neither of them are.

A giant in Gulliver’s Travels by Jonathan Swift is depicted with a staff “near as tall as the mainmast of the Royal Sovereign.”

Notes

References
Lavery, Brian (2003) The Ship of the Line - Volume 1: The development of the battlefleet 1650-1850. Conway Maritime Press. .

External links
 

Ships of the line of the Royal Navy
1700s ships